Incurvaria evocata is a moth of the family Incurvariidae. It is known from India.

The wingspan is about 8 mm.

References

Incurvariidae
Moths described in 1924